Cool the Earth Inc. is a non-profit educational organization based in Northern California.  The mission of Cool the Earth is to educate kids and their families about climate change and motivate them to take simple measurable actions at home to reduce their carbon emissions.  Currently, the organization offers programming to over 500 elementary schools nationwide.

History
Cool the Earth was founded in 2007 by Marin County parents, Carleen and Jeff Cullen, in the North San Francisco Bay Area. The couple said that they were influenced by Al Gore's documentary on climate change, An Inconvenient Truth. Surprised by what they had learned, the Cullens held screenings of the film where parents from their community could view and discuss ways to fight climate changes. Despite their efforts, the Cullens realized that people were still slow to take action.  Thus, Cool the Earth was established with other parent volunteers from their community to motivate people to make more eco-friendly choices. The program was first launched at Bacich Elementary School in Kentfield, California (the school that the Cullen's children attended at the time).  Carleen Cullen mentioned running Cool the Earth out of her garage with 10 employees and several teachers and parent volunteers who work across the 25 North San Francisco Bay Area elementary and middle schools.

Since 2007, Cool the Earth has been responsible for motivating over 323,000 energy-saving actions to be taken by over 250,000 school children and family members—eliminating over 40 million pounds of carbon from the atmosphere—with positive environmental benefits for the region.

In 2018, Cool the Earth launched a collaborative effort with other Northern California nonprofits and organizations called Drive Clean Bay Area (DCBA) with the goal of helping consumers switch from fossil fuels to renewable energy, mainly by switching to electric vehicles. Carleen Cullen, DCBA’s founder and executive director, started the effort with a belief that in order to bring about a rapid transition to clean vehicles, collaboration was not only valuable but essential. The approach is data-driven and is structured with Cool the Earth acting as the backbone providing data services, marketing and program development; NGO’s Acterra, Charge Across Town and 350BayArea acting as strategic program partners; over 50 cities, utilities and CCAs, NGOs and agencies acting as promotion partners in their communities.

A new pilot partnership with Veloz’ Electric for All (EFA) campaign positions DCBA for rapid growth, offering their sizeable audience the opportunity to connect with DCBA.

Method
The Cool the Earth flagship program was launched in 2007 and is now reaching over 500 schools, and over 60  aftercare centers, and Girl Scout troops nationwide. The program has catalyzed over 300,000 energy-efficiency actions. CTEI offers a school-to-home program that is not curriculum-based.

Cool the Earth uses a child-driven model to inspire families to conserve energy and resources. This model in which the family acts together out of concern for the dangers of global warming, has recently been cited by the first major "National Household Survey on Global Warming" as one of the most effective methods to create positive environmental change. The program employs a method that engages all the children at school and gives them the tools to catalyze their parents so that the whole family reduces their carbon footprint. The program is built around community action. Children, parents, and teachers see that by working together, individual actions are meaningful.

Kids who participate are learning about consumption habits, and parents are becoming engaged in the climate change crisis—similar to how kids brought home the message of recycling and “don’t smoke.”

The organization has established partnerships with The Bay Area Air Board, The Chabot Space & Science Center, Marin Community Foundation, Marin Conservation Corps, Strategic Energy Innovations, Marin Municipal Water District, Safe Routes to School, Al Gore’s The Climate Project.

Program
Currently available for free to any elementary school in the USA, the Cool the Earth program launches with a school-wide assembly featuring an age-appropriate play, which educates children about global warming and empowers them to take 20 low or no-cost actions to reduce their energy use at home. Since the pandemic hit, Cool the Earth has revamped their program, making it fully online and available to any child or family to access. 

The 3-5 month program measures the actions the children and their families take from a coupon book which goes home with the kids, and celebrates the results on a visible banner at school. This program is available to any elementary school in the country at http://cooltheearth.org. The program has been developed in both English and Spanish and both versions are available on the website. The program has already motivated over 250,000 kids and their families to take over 323,000 actions to reduce their carbon emissions, eliminating over 60 million pounds of global warming gases from the atmosphere.

Aimed at kindergartners through eighth-graders, Cool the Earth is helping students at more than 500 schools reuse, recycle and conserve by making small changes—both at school and at home.

Drive Clean Bay Area
DCBA provides programming in workplaces, schools and communities. The campaign focuses on inspiring individuals to drive electric now and/or commit to making their next car electric.  The approach used is cradle to grave, segmenting their marketing and programs based to best help the consumer move to EV. In just one year, the campaign's advertising has reached over a quarter-million residents, and 6,000 individuals have directly engaged in DCBA's programs. In the past 10 weeks alone, nearly 1,000 Bay Area residents have participated in EV 101 Zoom events.

Awards
California Air Resources Board Excellence Award
Jefferson Award (awarded to Carleen Cullen for founding Cool the Earth)
Breathe California's Clean Air Award
Flora Foundation Award for best non-profit four-minute video
MTC Award for Excellence in Transportation, October 2010

See also
Education in the United States
Environment of the United States
Environmental groups and resources serving K–12 schools

References

External links
 Cool the Earth

Schools programs
Environmental organizations based in California
Environmental organizations established in 2007
Climate change in the United States